Mary May may refer to:

Mary May, character in Andre (film)
David and Mary May House, Ohio, USA
Mary Simon, née Mary May, Canadian diplomat
 Marta May (b. 1939), Spanish actress

See also